Ronald McDonald is the primary mascot to the McDonald's restaurant franchise.

Ronald McDonald may also refer to:

Mac (It's Always Sunny in Philadelphia) (Ronald McDonald), a character from the television series It's Always Sunny in Philadelphia
Ron McDonald (1933–2000), Australian rules footballer
Ronald  Macdonald, characters in a satirical 2014 advertising campaign for Taco Bell
Ronald Carroll McDonald (1926–2011), child rapist

See also
Ronald MacDonald (disambiguation)
Donald McDonald (disambiguation)
Donald MacDonald (disambiguation)
Ranald MacDonald (disambiguation)